Ravi Balhara (born 8 November 1995) is an Indian cricketer. He made his first-class debut for Haryana in the 2018–19 Ranji Trophy on 14 December 2018. He made his Twenty20 debut on 15 November 2019, for Haryana in the 2019–20 Syed Mushtaq Ali Trophy.

References

External links
 

1995 births
Living people
Indian cricketers
Haryana cricketers
Place of birth missing (living people)